Kārlis Leiškalns (born August 10, 1951) is a Latvian politician born in Jūrmala. He is a Deputy of the Saeima and a member of the People's Party.

References

1951 births
Living people
People from Jūrmala
Democratic Center Party of Latvia politicians
Latvian Way politicians
People's Party (Latvia) politicians
Honor to serve Riga politicians
Deputies of the 5th Saeima
Deputies of the 6th Saeima
Deputies of the 7th Saeima
Deputies of the 9th Saeima